From 1811 to 1980, the faculty educated all lawyers of Norway, and still educates around 75% of new legal candidates. Its alumni hence includes the vast majority of the country's preeminent legal professionals, including academics, supreme court justices, senior civil servants, and a large number of politicians, among them 11 Prime Ministers and many cabinet ministers. This list of University of Oslo Faculty of Law alumni is limited to alumni who are notable outside the realm of Norwegian law.

Politicians

Prime Ministers of Norway 
 Christian Homann Schweigaard
 Francis Hagerup
 Emil Stang
 Johan Sverdrup
 Christian August Selmer
 Frederik Stang
 Wollert Konow (SB)
 Otto B. Halvorsen
 Otto Albert Blehr
 Jan P. Syse
 John Lyng

Foreign Ministers of Norway 
 Jan Petersen
 Knut Frydenlund
 Andreas Cappelen
 Svenn Stray
 John Lyng
 Erling Wikborg
 Trygve Lie
 Johannes Irgens
 Thorvald Stoltenberg
 Arnold Ræstad
 Christian Fredrik Michelet

Finance Ministers of Norway 
 Christian Michelsen
 Birger Kildal
 Søren Tobias Årstad
 Georg August Thilesen
 Fredrik Stang Lund
 Francis Hagerup
 Ole Andreas Furu
 Evald Rygh
 Olaj Olsen
 Herman Johan Foss Reimers
 Christian Homann Schweigaard
 Henrik Laurentius Helliesen
 Jens Holmboe
 August Christian Manthey
 Erik Røring Møinichen
 Christian Zetlitz Bretteville
 Rolf Presthus
 Andreas Zeier Cappelen
 Olav Meisdalshagen
 Erik Brofoss
 Gunnar Jahn
 Paul Ernst Wilhelm Hartmann
 Per Berg Lund
 Arnold Holmboe
 Otto Blehr
 Edvard Hagerup Bull

Other cabinet members 
 Hanne Bjurstrøm, former minister of labour and social inclusion
 Johan Castberg, former minister of justice and minister of Social Affairs, Trade, Industry and Fisheries
 Grete Faremo, former minister justice, former minister of defence, minister of justice and minister of international development
 Jens Holmboe, former minister of justice, minister of church and education and minister of the navy and postal affairs
 Rolf Jacobsen, former minister of defence
 Knut Storberget, former minister of justice
 Hadia Tajik, leader Standing Committee on Justice in the Norwegian Parliament, former Minister of Culture

Members of the Norwegian Parliament 
 Abid Raja, member of the Norwegian Parliament for the Liberal Party since 2013
 Anton Martin Schweigaard, prominent former member of the Norwegian Parliament
 Michael Tetzschner, member of the Norwegian Parliament for the Conservative Party since 2009
 Olemic Thommessen, President of the Parliament of Norway since 2013

Chairpersons of the Norwegian Nobel Committee 
 Bernhard Getz
 Fredrik Stang
 Gunnar Jahn

Other politicians 
 Stian Berger Røsland, Governing Mayor of Oslo (since 2009)
 Fabian Stang, Mayor of Oslo (since 2007)
 Fritz Huitfeldt, former Chairman of the City Government of Oslo (1997-2000)
 Hans Svelland, former Chairman of the City Government of Oslo (1986-1989)

Rectors of the University of Oslo 
 Johs Andenæs
 Lucy Smith
 Frede Castberg
 Fredrik Stang
 Bredo Henrik von Munthe af Morgenstierne

International lawyers 
 Rolv Ryssdal, former president of the European Court of Human Rights
 Frede Castberg, former president of the Hague Academy of International Law
 Mads Andenæs, former director of the British Institute of International and Comparative Law
 Erik Møse, former president of the International Criminal Tribunal for Rwanda and current (since 2011) judge at the European Court of Human Rights
 Torkel Opsahl, former member of the European Commission of Human Rights and of the United Nations Human Rights Committee
 Helge Klæstad, former president of the International Court of Justice

Diplomats 
 Trygve Lie, first Secretary-General of the United Nations
 Edvard Hambro, former President of the United Nations General Assembly
 Morten Wetland, former permanent Norwegian representative to the United Nations
 Wegger Christian Strømmen, former Norwegian ambassador to the United States
 Fritz Wedel Jarlsberg, notable diplomat

Civil servants

Governors of Norges Bank 
 Nicolai Rygg
 Erik Brofoss
 Gunnar Jahn

Directors of the Norwegian Data Inspectorate 
 Bjørn Erik Thon
 Georg Apenes

Other civil servants 
 Yngve Slyngstad, head of The Government Pension Fund – Global
 Nina Frisak, current (since 2001) regjeringsråd (the highest ranking civil servant position in the Norwegian government)

Businesspeople 
 John G. Bernander, former director-general of the Norwegian Broadcasting Corporation and the Confederation of Norwegian Enterprise
 Bjørn Kjos, founder of Norwegian Air Shuttle
 Carl Falck, former leader of Norges Grossistforbund. Norway's oldest man as of 2014.
 Anders Jahre, shipping magnate
 Helge Kringstad, former CEO of DnC (now DNB)
 Øyvind Eriksen, CEO of Aker Solutions

World War II resistance fighters 
 Jens Christian Hauge, also former minister of defence and minister of justice
 Gregers Gram, assassinated before he could finish his studies
 Gunnar Jahn, later minister of finance and governor of Norges Bank
 Vilhelm Aubert, member of XU, later professor at the Factualty
 Knut Løfsnes, leader of an XU department, later chairman of the Socialist People's Party
 Erik Gjems-Onstad, captain of the Norwegian Home Guard, later member of parliament
 Lorentz Brinch, leader of the Milorg chapter in Oslo
 Sven Arntzen, member of the Milorg military council, later Director of Public Prosecutions

Explorers 
 Helge Ingstad, discoverer of pre-Columbian Viking settlement in North America
 Erling Kagge, the first person to accomplish the "three pole challenge", and the first to walk to the South Pole alone